Christina McDowell (Born March 14, 1985) is an American author, actress, and filmmaker, best known for her debut novel, After Perfect.

Early life 

McDowell was born on March 14, 1985, in Washington, D.C., to Gayle L. (née McDowell) Prousalis and Thomas T. Prousalis, Jr., a prominent Washington, D.C., securities attorney and former decorated Air Force fighter pilot. McDowell had a privileged upbringing as the middle of three sisters, and the family resided in the wealthy Washington, D.C., suburb of McLean, Virginia around the corner from "Hickory Hill," the well-known Kennedy Estate.  McDowell was an honors graduate of St Andrew's Episcopal High School a private school in suburban Washington, D.C.  McDowell attended Loyola Marymount University in Los Angeles, but did not graduate, withdrawing from the university after her freshman year due to her father's legal troubles, resulting in her family's financial collapse.

Writing 
On December 26, 2013, McDowell penned an op-ed for the LA Weekly criticizing the Hollywood film The Wolf of Wall Street and lambasting Leonardo DiCaprio and Martin Scorsese for glorifying greed and "psychopathic behavior" that destroyed families like her own. Her LA Weekly op-ed went viral receiving more than 3.7 million page views and generating international coverage, including a piece in The Guardian calling international attention to her personal strife and family drama. Less than a month after McDowell's op-ed was initially published, several publishing houses expressed interest in McDowell writing a novel about the events of her life, her father's legal troubles, and her subsequent downward spiral.

Her 2015 memoir, After Perfect, details her family's implosion and her personal experience with poverty, depression, drug addiction, and redemption. One critic wrote that it was "a brutally honest, cautionary tale about one family's destruction in the wake of the Wall Street implosion," and it has also been described as "a rare, insider's perspective on the collateral damage of a fall from grace". The book was listed as a must-read in publications and digital journals including the Village Voice, PopSugar, Oprah's O magazine, and People Magazine. In numerous interviews, McDowell discusses the transformative power of writing and how crafting her memoir was a form of catharsis in the wake of much pain and loss.

After Perfect was published by Gallery Books—an imprint of Simon & Schuster—in 2015 and is currently being adapted for the screen by writer/director Elizabeth Chomko. 

McDowell's second book, The Cave Dwellers, an examination of high society in Washington, D.C., was released by Simon and Schuster in 2020.

Awards and accolades 
The Village Voice: 15 Books You Need to Read in 2015

PopSugar: Best of June

O Magazine: Season's Best Biography and Memoir

People Magazine: Twelve Best Summer Beach Books

Bliss, Beauty, and Beyond: Bachelorette Poolside Picks

Brit and Co: 15 Must Read Books Coming Out This June

Other work 
In the years since her author debut, McDowell has become an advocate for restorative justice and criminal justice reform. Alongside Oscar-nominated producer, Matthew Cooke, McDowell is the co-producer of the documentary, "Survivor's Guide to Prison" about America's mass incarceration crisis, released in 2018. Additionally, she is involved with the non-profit InsideOUT Writers (an organization that helps incarcerated youth by leveraging creative writing as a catalyst for personal transformation), and POPS (an LA-based non-profit that provides support for kids and teens with family members in prison).

Miscellaneous 
McDowell owns a small Havanese dog named Zelda Fitzgerald.

References

1985 births
Living people
21st-century American novelists
American women novelists
Novelists from Washington, D.C.
American filmmakers
American women film directors
Loyola Marymount University alumni
21st-century American memoirists
American women memoirists
21st-century American women writers